Group 2 of the 1950 FIFA World Cup took place from 25 June to 2 July 1950. The group consisted of England, Spain, Chile, and the United States. The group winners advanced to the final round.

Standings

Matches
All times listed are local time.

England vs Chile

Spain vs United States

Spain vs Chile

United States vs England

|valign="top"|
|valign="top" width="50%"|

|}

Spain vs England

Chile vs United States

References

External links
 1950 FIFA World Cup archive

1950 FIFA World Cup
England at the 1950 FIFA World Cup
Spain at the 1950 FIFA World Cup
United States at the 1950 FIFA World Cup
Chile at the 1950 FIFA World Cup